Stromboceros delicatulus is a Palearctic species of  sawfly  belonging to the genus Stromboceros.

Its larvae feed on ferns, e.g., Athyrium filix-femina (common ladyfern), Dryopteris filix-mas (male fern), Onoclea sensibilis (sensitive fern) and Pteridium aquilinum (bracken fern).

References

External links
The sawflies (Symphyta) of Britain and Ireland

Hymenoptera of Europe
Tenthredinidae
Insects described in 1808